Peter Quinn (born 1944) served as the 30th president of the Gaelic Athletic Association from 1991 until 1994. A native of Gortmullan, Teemore, County Fermanagh, Northern Ireland, Quinn is a financial advisor by profession. He is also a brother of Seán Quinn.

Quinn played for the Teemore club in Fermanagh, winning a Junior Football Championship. However, his only involvement with the Fermanagh seniors was in the Dr Lagan Cup and some challenge matches; he was never even included in a championship panel.

His autobiography is entitled The Outsider.

References

1944 births
Living people
Fermanagh inter-county Gaelic footballers
Presidents of the Gaelic Athletic Association
Teemore Gaelic footballers